Under the Influence is the first major label album by the American singer/songwriter Terra Naomi.

Track listing
"Say It's Possible" – 3:51
"Not Sorry" – 3:50
"Up Here" – 3:59
"I'm Happy" – 3:40
"Never Quite Discussed" – 3:33
"Flesh for Bones" – 5:35
"Close to Your Head" – 3:13
"Jenny" – 3:21
"Million Ways" – 4:14
"New Song" – 4:34
"Something Good to Show You" – 8:32
"The Vicodin Song" – this hidden song begins playing at the 4:05 mark after "Something Good to Show You"

External links
 Terra Naomi official website
 Terra Naomi on MySpace

2007 debut albums